Yannan station is a station of Shenzhen Metro Line 2. It opened on 28 June 2011. It is located under the cross between Zhenhua Road and Yannan Road.

Station layout

Exits

External links
 Shenzhen Metro Yannan Station (Chinese)
 Shenzhen Metro Yannan Station (English)

Shenzhen Metro stations
Railway stations in Guangdong
Futian District
Railway stations in China opened in 2011